The Royal Canadian Horse Artillery is the name given to the regular field artillery units of the Canadian Army.

Organization

The Regular Force has three RCHA regiments:

 1st Regiment, Royal Canadian Horse Artillery this is the descendant of the original batteries of artillery formed in 1871, and is thus the senior Regular unit in the Canadian army. 1 RCHA was forward deployed in Germany as part of Canadian Forces Europe for 25 years between 1967, and the final Canadian withdrawal from Europe in 1993. Currently, this regiment is part of 3rd Canadian Division's 1 Canadian Mechanized Brigade Group.
 2nd Regiment, Royal Canadian Horse Artillery 2 RCHA was formed in 1950 for service in the Korean War. 2 RCHA is part of 4th Canadian Division's 2 Canadian Mechanized Brigade Group and is located in Garrison Petawawa. It is composed of two Gun Batteries (D and E), one Surveillance and Target Acquisition Battery (F), a Forward Observation Battery (Y), and its Headquarters Battery (HQ). 
 5e Régiment d'artillerie légère du Canada 5 RALC is the francophone element of the regular artillery, and was formed in 1968. 5 RALC is part of 2nd Canadian Division's 5 Canadian Mechanized Brigade Group.  It is composed of two Gun Batteries (X and R), one Surveillance and Target Acquisition Battery (Q), a Forward Observation Battery (V), and its Headquarters Battery (C/S).

History
RCHA units are the senior units of the Canadian land field force, with a history dating back to the birth of Canada as a nation. 'A' and 'B' Batteries of Garrison Artillery were formed as the first units of Canada's permanent military force in 1871 in Kingston and Quebec City respectively, with a third ('C' Battery) authorized in 1883 and formed in 1887 in Esquimalt. These bore the name of the Regiment of Canadian Artillery, with the Royal Canadian Artillery being formed as the militia element in 1895. In 1905, to distinguish between the regular force and militia, the regulars were given the title Royal Canadian Horse Artillery.

In addition to the three regiments currently serving, two further regiments have served in the past prior to being disbanded:
 3rd Regiment, RCHA originally formed as 79th Field Regiment, RCA, this regiment received its name in 1953 during the reorganization of the Canadian Army as a result of Canada's NATO commitments. 3 RCHA was reduced to nil strength in 1992 following the downsizing of the Land Force, and was replaced at CFB Shilo by 1 RCHA on its return from Germany.
 4th Regiment, RCHA originally 81st Field Regiment, RCA, this regiment became part of the Royal Canadian Horse Artillery at the same time as 3 RCHA in 1953. 4 RCHA was primarily stationed at CFB Petawawa until 1970 when, following the formation of 5 RALC, it was reduced to nil strength and replaced by 2 RCHA.

The Freedom of the City was exercised by the 2nd Regiment, Royal Canadian Horse Artillery in Kingston in 1983; 1996 and May 26, 2012.

Lineage of Royal Canadian Horse Artillery units

|-
|style="text-align: left;"|
 class="wikitable"
+ Abbreviations used in the chart
-
! Abbreviation !! Phrase
-
 Bde  Brigade
-
 Bn  Battalion
-
 Btys  Batteries
-
 CASF  Canadian Active Service Force
-
 CEF  Canadian Expeditionary Force
-
 CFA  Canadian Field Artillery
-
 Div.  Division
-
 RCA  Royal Canadian Artillery
-
 RCFA  Royal Canadian Field Artillery
-
 RCHA  Royal Canadian Horse Artillery
-
 Regt  Regiment
-
 Régt  Régiment

Commemorations

The Royal Canadian Horse Artillery badge (1968) by Robert McCausland Limited is a stained glass memorial to 2517 Colonel E. Geoffrey Brooks DSO OBE CD (RMC 1952), who served as the Royal Military College of Canada's staff adjutant 1948–1950 and as Director of Artillery, Royal Canadian Artillery in August 1960. He is remembered in the Geoffrey Brooks Memorial Essay Competition – 2,000 to 3,000 words on any topic of military history or specific military interest that pertains to The Royal Regiment of Canadian Artillery. The contest (1st Prize -$500; 2nd Prize -$300; and 3rd Prize – $200) is open to all DND military (Regular and Reserve) and civilian personnel and students attending post-secondary educational institutes.

Affiliations 

 : Royal Horse Artillery

See also 

 The Canadian Crown and the Canadian Armed Forces
 List of Canadian organizations with royal patronage

Media
 RCHA—Right of the Line: An Anecdotal History of the Royal Canadian Horse Artillery from 1871 by B.A.; Simcock, W.; Goski, Joseph G. Mitchell G.D.; Reid (1986)
 Ataliumasta: Cyprus, August 1985 – March 1986: Second Regiment, Royal Canadian Horse Artillery, 3 Commando Canadian by unknown (9999)

References

Order of precedence

External links 
 History and Uniform of the Royal Canadian Horse Artillery, 1871 to 1970
 1st Regiment, Royal Canadian Horse Artillery (Official website)
 2nd Regiment, Royal Canadian Horse Artillery (Official website)
 2nd Regiment, Royal Canadian Horse Artillery (Unofficial website)
 5e Régiment d'artillerie légère du Canada  (Unofficial site)

Royal Regiment of Canadian Artillery
Army units and formations of Canada in World War I
Regiments of Canada in World War II
Military units and formations of Canada in the Korean War
Artillery administrative corps